Nathaniel Goddard Benchley (November 13, 1915 – December 14, 1981) was an American writer from Massachusetts.

Early life
Born in Newton, Massachusetts to a literary family, he was the son of Robert Benchley (1889–1945), a noted American writer, humorist, critic, and actor and one founder of the Algonquin Round Table in New York City, and Gertrude Darling. He graduated from Phillips Exeter Academy and Harvard College.

Benchley enlisted in the U.S. Navy prior to the attack on Pearl Harbor. He served as a public relations officer, and on destroyers and patrol craft in North Atlantic convoy duty (Battle of the Atlantic), and was transferred to the Pacific Theater in 1945.

Writing career
After the war Benchley worked for the weekly magazine Newsweek as an assistant drama editor. Harcourt, Brace published Benchley's first book in 1950, Side Street, a novel featuring "hilarious activities of two New York City families living in the East Sixties"—that is, living on the East Side of Manhattan near 60th Street. 
He wrote a biography of his father Robert that McGraw-Hill published in 1955. 
In 1960 Harper & Row published his second novel, Sail a Crooked Ship, and Random House his first children's book, retold from Sindbad the Sailor with illustrations by Tom O'Sullivan.

Benchley was the respected author of much children's fiction that provides readers an experience of certain animal species, historical settings, and so on (Oscar Otter, Sam the Minuteman, etc). He presented diverse locales and topics: for instance, Bright Candles recounts the experiences of a 16-year-old Danish boy during the German occupation of Denmark in World War II; Small Wolf features a Native American boy who meets white men on the island of Manhattan and learns that their ideas about land are different from those of his own people.

Sail a Crooked Ship was adapted as a black-and-white comedy feature film of the same name by Columbia Pictures in 1961. His 1961 novel The Off-Islanders was made into comedy feature The Russians Are Coming, the Russians Are Coming by director/producer Norman Jewison in 1965. The Visitors (1965) was adapted as a horror/comedy feature The Spirit Is Willing by Paramount Pictures in 1967.

Benchley was a friend of the actor Humphrey Bogart and wrote a Bogart biography published in 1975. In October of that year, ABC showed the made-for-TV drama Sweet Hostage, based on his 1968 novel Welcome to Xanadu.

Personal life
Benchley and Margaret Bradford were married not long after his college years. They settled  in New York City and had two sons, one before and one after World War II. 
Elder son Peter Benchley (1940–2006) was a writer, known best for the novel Jaws and the screenplay for its Steven Spielberg film, the 1975 blockbuster Jaws. Younger son Nat Benchley is a writer and actor who has portrayed his grandfather, Robert Benchley, in a one-man, semi-biographical stage show, Benchley Despite Himself. The show was a compilation of Robert Benchley's best monologues, short films, radio rantings, and pithy pieces as recalled, edited, and acted by grandson Nat, combined with family reminiscences and friends' perspectives.

Nathaniel Benchley died 1981 in Boston and was interred in the family plot at Prospect Hill Cemetery in Nantucket.

Bibliography

Novels
 Side Street (Harcourt, Brace, 1950)
 A Firm Word or Two (1958)

Catch a Falling Spy (1964)
A Winter's Tale (1964)
The Visitors (1965)

The Monument : A Satiric Novel (1966)
Welcome to Xanadu (1968)
The Wake of the Icarus (1969)
Lassiter's Folly (1971)

A Necessary End: A Novel of World War II (1976)
Sweet Anarchy (1979)
Portrait of a Scoundrel (1979)
All Over Again (1981)
Speakeasy (1982)

Non-fiction
 The Benchley Roundup: A Selection by Nathaniel Benchley of His Favorites (1954), by Robert Benchley,   
 
 Humphrey Bogart (1975)

Essays and reporting 
 "Introduction", Twentieth Century Parody, American and British, ed. Burling Lowrey (1960),

Short fiction

Plays 
 The frogs of spring, a comedy in three acts (1954) https://lccn.loc.gov/54036696

Children's books

Welcome to Xanadu (1968)
 The Flying Lesson of Gerald Pelican (1970), illus. Mamoru Funai  
 Feldman Fieldmouse: A Fable (1971), illus. Hilary Knight  
 Gone and Back (1971) – Oklahoma "pioneer adventure of Obediah Taylor, a boy reaching manhood"   
 The Magic Sled (1972), illus. Mel Furukawa; UK title, The Magic Sledge  
 Only Earth and Sky Last Forever (1972) – "Although recognizing the end of the Indians' freedom is near, a young Cheyenne still chooses to fight with Crazy Horse",   
 The Deep Dives of Stanley Whale (1973), illus. Mischa Richter  
 Bright Candles: A Novel of the Danish Resistance (1974) – features "a sixteen-year-old Danish boy during the German occupation",   
 Beyond the Mists: A Novel (1975) – features "an adventurous youth who travels to Vinland with Leif Eriksson",  
 Kilroy and the Gull (1977), illus. John Schoenherr  – a Marineland killer whale "escapes to life on the open sea with his friend Morris the sea gull",  
 Demo and the Dolphin (1981), illus. Stephen Gammell  
 Snip (1981), illus. Irene Trivas  
 Walter, the Homing Pigeon (1981), illus. Whitney Darrow  

I Can Read series

 Red Fox and His Canoe (1964), illustrated by Arnold Lobel  
 Oscar Otter (1966), illus. Lobel  
 The Strange Disappearance of Arthur Cluck (1967), illus. Lobel  
 A Ghost Named Fred (1968), illus. Ben Shecter  
 Sam, the Minuteman (1969), illus. Lobel  
 The Several Tricks of Edgar Dolphin (1970), illus. Mamoru Funai  
 Small Wolf (1972), illus. Joan Sandin  
 Snorri and the Strangers (1976), illus. Don Bolognese  
 George, the Drummer Boy (1977), illus. Bolognese  
 Running Owl the Hunter (1979), illus. Funai

References

External links

 
 
 

1915 births
1981 deaths
20th-century American biographers
20th-century American male writers
20th-century American novelists
American children's writers
American magazine editors
American male biographers
American male novelists
Esquire (magazine) people
Harvard College alumni
The New Yorker people
Novelists from Massachusetts
Phillips Exeter Academy alumni
United States Navy personnel of World War II
Writers from Newton, Massachusetts